Christian Hefenbrock born (15 May 1985 in Kyritz, Germany) is a former international motorcycle speedway rider from Germany.

Career
He first rode in the United Kingdom for the Wolverhampton Wolves  in the Elite League in 2006. It was in 2006 that he became the German champion after winning the German Individual Speedway Championship.

In 2007, he was signed by the Lakeside Hammers but was replaced mid season when one of their own assets was made available.

He has represented the Germany team in the Speedway World Cup in every tournament from 2003 until 2007. Also in 2007 he was awarded the wild card place for the 2007 Speedway Grand Prix of Germany, winning his opening ride.

Speedway Grand Prix

Career honours 
Individual World Championship (Speedway Grand Prix):
 2007 - 27th place (4 points in 1 event)

Individual U-21 World Championship:
 2004 - 15th place (2 points)
 2005 - 13th place (3 points)
 2006 - 3rd place (12+2 points)

Team World Championship (Speedway World Cup):
 2003 - 10th place ( points in Event 1)
 2004 - 2nd place in Qualifying round 1 (9 points)
 2005 - 8th place  (0 points in Event 2)
 2006 - 2nd place in Qualifying round 1 (12 points)
 2007 - 2nd place in Qualifying round 1 (9 points)
 2008 - 2nd place in Qualifying round 1 (12 points)
 2009 - 2nd place in Qualifying round 1 (11 points)

Team U-21 World Championship:
 2005 - 2nd place in Qualifying Round 1 (6 points)
 2006 - 4th place (10 points)

Individual European Championship:
 2006 - 3rd place (12 points)
 2007 - 8th place (9 points)

Individual U-19 European Championship:
 2004 - 8th place (6 points)

European Pairs Championship:
 2004 - track reserve in Semi-Final 1
 2005 - 5th place (7 points)
 2006 - 0 points in Semi-Final 2

European Club Champions' Cup:
 2003 - 3rd place in Group A (8 points)
 2004 - 3rd place in Group A (12 points)

See also
 Germany national speedway team
 List of Speedway Grand Prix riders

References

External links

1985 births
Living people
People from Kyritz
German speedway riders
Polonia Bydgoszcz riders
Wolverhampton Wolves riders
Lakeside Hammers riders
Expatriate speedway riders in Poland
German expatriate sportspeople in Poland
Sportspeople from Brandenburg